Canthigaster compressa, also known as the compressed toby  or fingerprint toby, is a  demersal Marine fish belonging to the family Tetraodontidae.

The fingerprint toby  is a small sized fish which grows up to 12 cm.

It is widely distributed throughout the tropical waters of the western Pacific Ocean.

It inhabits the shallow sandy to silty lagoons, harbours or channels from 2 to 12 m.
Canthigaster compressa  has a diurnal activity.

References

External links
WoRMS - World Register of Marine Species - Canthigaster compressa (Marion de Procé, 1822)
 

compressa
Fish described in 1822